The Askern branch line is a railway line which runs in North, South and West Yorkshire in England. The stretch of track runs from Shaftholme Junction north of Doncaster (on the East Coast Main Line between Doncaster and York), via Askern, Norton and Womersley to Knottingley, where it joins the Pontefract Line.

History
It was opened by the Lancashire & Yorkshire Railway on 6 June 1848 and running powers were granted to the Great Northern Railway (with which it made an end-on junction at Askern) giving the latter company its initial access to Leeds (using part of the current Pontefract Line) and the former to Doncaster. The line subsequently became part of the newly established East Coast Main Line with the opening of a branch from Knottingley to Burton Salmon in 1850, which gave access to the York & North Midland Railway's line from Normanton to York.

The opening of a direct line from Shaftholme Junction to York via Selby in January 1871 saw the end of regular express trains using the route, but it remained busy with goods traffic, mainly coal from various collieries along its length and continued to carry a local stopping service from Wakefield to Doncaster until closure to passengers on 27 September 1948.

Modern use
The line remains open to freight traffic, and passenger trains diverted when either the ECML or Doncaster – Leeds line is closed for engineering work.

After a more than 70-year hiatus, regular scheduled passenger services were restarted by open-access operator Grand Central from the May 2010 timetable change, with the first services running as planned on 23 May 2010.

These trains run between London King's Cross and Bradford Interchange via Doncaster, Knottingley, then on via Pontefract Monkhill, Wakefield Kirkgate, Mirfield, Brighouse and Halifax. The necessary track access rights (for an initial three trains per day each way) were awarded to Grand Central by the ORR in January 2009.

For the December 2011 timetable change, the company announced that it wished to remove the stops at Pontefract and divert its remaining services via Adwick to significantly reduce journey times, but permission for this from the ORR was not forthcoming. In December 2013 Grand Central services started to serve Mirfield, and a fourth return service via this route.

Infrastructure operator Network Rail carried out upgrade works at the southern end of the line between 2012 and 2014. This allows coal trains from the deep water import terminal at Port of Immingham to run directly to the Aire valley power stations without needing to join the ECML at Joan Croft Junction and use a  section from there towards , thus freeing up capacity on a busy section of the route. The new flyover known as Doncaster North Chord, was opened in June 2014.

Incidents

Askern level crossing
On Monday 3 December 1849, a rear collision with a vehicle resulted in a derailment. Four people were injured.

Haywood level crossing
This level crossing is a CCTV level crossing controlled by Norton Signal Box. On Thursday 26 February 2009, at around 1 pm, an HGV lorry smashed into the barriers, causing delays to freight services.

Norton level crossing
Norton level crossing is right next to Norton signal box which controls most of the level crossings on the Askern branch line.
On Thursday 21 June 2012, a Land Rover smashed through the barriers after fleeing from a burglary, and smashed into two waiting cars at the other side of the crossing. This resulting in a full road closure, major delays to the freight services and to the London King's Cross to Bradford Interchange service. Four barriers were totally wrecked, so Network Rail replaced them. Further investigation of the level crossing crash is still underway.

References

 

Railway lines in Yorkshire and the Humber
Rail transport in Doncaster
Rail transport in South Yorkshire
Rail transport in North Yorkshire
Rail transport in West Yorkshire
Railway lines opened in 1848